Everett "Rett" L. Bull (born August 16, 1949) is an American computer scientist. He is the Emeritus Professor of Computer Science at Pomona College in Claremont, California, and held the Osler-Loucks Professor of Science and Professor of Computer Science endowed chair.

Early life and education 
Bull earned his bachelor's degree from Pomona College, graduating in 1971 with a degree in mathematics. He then completed a doctorate at the Massachusetts Institute of Technology in 1976.

Career 
Bull began teaching at Pomona in 1981.

Personal life 
Bull is married to Jill S. Grigsby, a retired sociologist at Pomona.

References

External links
Faculty page at Pomona College

1949 births
Living people
Pomona College faculty
American computer scientists
People from Claremont, California
Pomona College alumni
Massachusetts Institute of Technology alumni